Louis Self (born February 12, 1950) is an American boxer. He competed in the men's featherweight event at the 1972 Summer Olympics.

References

1950 births
Living people
American male boxers
Olympic boxers of the United States
Boxers at the 1972 Summer Olympics
Sportspeople from Toledo, Ohio
Boxers from Ohio
Featherweight boxers